St Ives Rowing Club is a rowing club on the River Great Ouse, based at 25 The Broadway, St Ives, Cambridgeshire.

History
The club was founded in 1865 by a local general practitioner called Dr Grove.

The club has produced some British champions, with a 1975 to 1991 recent peak.

Club colours
The colours are together: red and black.

Honours

British champions

Notable members
 Tony Cowley
 Nigel Drake

References

Sport in Cambridgeshire
Rowing clubs in England
Rowing clubs of the River Great Ouse
St Ives, Cambridgeshire
Rowing clubs in Cambridgeshire